Christian Larson may refer to:

 Christian D. Larson (1874–1954), New Thought leader and teacher
 Christian Larson (director), Swedish film and music video director

See also
Christian Larsen (disambiguation)